Sepasar may refer to:
Mets Sepasar, Armenia
Pokr Sepasar, Armenia